Marine Aviation Logistics Squadron 39 (MALS-39) is an aviation logistics support unit of the United States Marine Corps. Known as the "Hellhounds", they fall under the command of Marine Aircraft Group 39 (MAG-39) and the 3rd Marine Aircraft Wing (3rd MAW) and are currently based at Marine Corps Air Station Camp Pendleton, California..

Mission
Provide aviation logistics support, guidance, planning and direction to Marine Aircraft Group squadrons on behalf of the commanding officer, as well as logistics support for Navy funded equipment in the supporting Marine Wing Support Squadron (MWSS), Marine Air Control Group (MACG), and Marine Aircraft Wing/Mobile Calibration Complex (MAW/MCC).

 Provide intermediate level maintenance for aircraft and aeronautical equipment of all supported units and, when authorized, perform first-degree repair on specific engines.
 Provide aviation supply support for aircraft and Navy-funded equipment to all supported units.
 Provide Class V(a) ammunition logistics support to the MAG's squadrons. This support encompasses the requisitioning, storage, handling, assembly, transportation, and inventory reporting of Class V(a) ammunition. Be capable of planning for, and operating, an airfield ammunition issue point at expeditionary airfields.
 Interpret, implement, audit, inspect, and provide oversight for the MAG, CO, of all policies and procedures relating to the administration and management of operations and maintenance, Navy funds, aviation supply, and aircraft.

History

Vietnam War
Provisional Headquarters and Maintenance Squadron 39 was activated on 16 April 1968 at Marine Quang Tri Airfield, Republic of Vietnam. Assigned to Provisional Marine Aircraft Group 39 (MAG-39) of the 1st Marine Aircraft Wing, the squadron's mission was to provide logistical support for the tactical squadrons and tactical elements located at Quang Tri, Dong Ha, And Khe Sanh. Provisional Headquarters and Maintenance Squadron 39 was deactivated on 25 October 1969.

1980s and 1990s

Headquarters and Maintenance Squadron 39 was reactivated at Camp Pendleton, California on 1 September 1978 to provide support for the UH1 "Huey", AH1 "Cobra", and OV-10 "Bronco". The squadron was redesignated on 1 October 1988 as Marine Aviation Logistics Squadron 39 (MALS-39). This changed placed aviation logistics support function firmly under the cognizance of one commanding officer to more efficiently and effectively serve the requirements of supported flying squadrons and Marine Air-ground Task Forces. MALS-39 provides all the aviation supply and intermediated level of aircraft maintenance, avionics, and ordnance support for nine flying squadrons. Additionally, whenever the flying squadrons deploy, whether in the United States or overseas, MALS-39 augments these squadrons with its Marines to ensure optimum aviation logistics support in every clime and place.
During the last ten years, Marines from MALS-39 have seen action throughout the world. Elements of the squadron participated in Operation Desert Storm and in the liberation of Kuwait. Magicians also participated in Operation Restore Hope in Somalia in Africa.

War on Terror
In January 2003, the squadron deployed as a command in support of Operation Enduring Freedom and Operation Iraqi Freedom (OIF) both aboard the SS Curtiss (T-AVB-4) aviation logistics support ship, and ashore at Ali Al Salem Air Base, Kuwait and at various Forward Operating Bases throughout Iraq. In February 2004, Magicians deployed as logistician augments to Marine Aviation Logistics Squadron 16, and as force protection augments to 3rd Low Altitude Air Defense Battalion again in support of OIF. MALS-39 Marines continually deploy to the Western Pacific supporting unit deployments to Okinawa, Japan and Marine Expeditionary Units afloat.

Awards
A unit citation or commendation is an award bestowed upon an organization for the action cited. Members of the unit who participated in said actions are allowed to wear on their uniforms the awarded unit citation. MALS-39 has been presented with the following awards:

The squadron has also been recognized for its logistics accomplishments, winning the 1998 Secretary of Defense Maintenance Award (Medium Category) and the 2003 Marine Corps Aviation Association Marine Aviation Logistics Squadron of the Year Award.

See also

 United States Marine Corps Aviation
 Organization of the United States Marine Corps
 List of United States Marine Corps aviation support units

References

External links
 

LOG39